The Silver Brumby (also known as The Silver Stallion or The Silver Stallion: King of the Wild Brumbies in overseas markets such as the United States) is a 1993 Australian drama-family film, directed by John Tatoulis, and starring actors Caroline Goodall, Russell Crowe and Amiel Daemion. It was based on the Silver Brumby series of novels by Elyne Mitchell.

Plot

A mother tells her daughter a fable about the prince of the brumbies- brumby being a term for the feral horses of Australia- who must find his place amongst his kind, while avoiding The Man who always seems to be hunting him.

The plot shifts to the birth of the titular character. Bel Bel, a wild palomino mare, gives birth to a blonde colt during a nighttime thunderstorm. She names the newborn foal Thowra, after the strong winds that blew that night. His sire, a chestnut stallion named Yarraman, is the leader of their herd.

The herd is under constant threat from being captured by men. One man becomes particularly obsessed with capturing Thowra, who is now a young stallion.

Cast
 Caroline Goodall as Elyne Mitchell
 Amiel Daemion as Indi Mitchell
 Russell Crowe as The Man / Egan
 Johnny Raaen as Jock 
 Buddy Tyson as Darcy
 Graeme Fullgrabe as Auctioneer
 Gary Amos as Rider #1
 Murray Chesson as Rider #2
 John Coles as Rider #3
 Danny Cook as Rider #4
 Peter Faithfull as Rider #5
 Richard Faithfull as Rider #6
 Cody Harris as Rider #7
 Ken Mitchell as Rider #8
 Charles A. Harris as Rider #9

Production
John Tatoulis says he was attracted to the project because of the spirituality of the Silver Brumby books. The film was shot in the high country of Victoria around Dinner Plain, Mount Hotham, Swindler's Creek and the Blue Ribbon ski area. A hut now known as the Silver Brumby Hut was built as a set prop at Mount Hotham and is now a tourist attraction.

Home media
The film was released in the United States on VHS in 1994 by Paramount Home Video and on DVD in 2004 by Artisan Entertainment.

Awards

Won
Australasian Performing Right Association 1994:
APRA Music Award - Best Film Score: Tassos Ioannides
Chicago International Children's Film Festival 1994:
Children's Jury Award - Feature Film
Cinekid 1994:
Audience Award - John Tatoulis

Nominations
Australian Film Institute 1993:
AFI Award - Best Screenplay: John Tatoulis

References

External links

The Silver Brumby at Oz Movies

1993 drama films
1993 films
Films about horses
Films about dogs
Films set in Victoria (Australia)
Films based on children's books
Films set in the 1950s
Films directed by John Tatoulis
Films produced by Colin South
Australian drama films
Roadshow Entertainment films
1990s English-language films
1990s Australian films